Shaukat Baig is an Indian actor, writer and assistant director who works mainly for Bollywood and Indian TV serials. He written more than 50 TV serials and over 20 Bollywood films. A former actor, he performed supporting roles in Bollywood films, including the television show Zaban Sambhal Ke.

Early life
Shaukat begun his career in theater as a writer and dramatic actor. He debuted in film industry in year 1992 as a writer.

Writer of films
Baig writes films, television, and poetry. His first Bollywood movie was Chamatkar, released in 1992.

Writer of TV serials

Actor in films

References

External links
 

Hindi screenwriters
Male actors in Hindi cinema
Living people
Year of birth missing (living people)